is a Japanese musician and bassist. He is known for his work with Oblivion Dust and Mega8Ball.

His musical career started as the bassist of Three Eyes Jack from 1989 to 1995, under the nickname "ChaChaMaru" (ちゃちゃ丸). In fall 1995 Rikiji formed Mega8Ball with vocalist/guitarist Tetsu Takano. The band later disbanded and had their last live performance on December 29, 1997.

In January 1998, almost immediately after, he joined Oblivion Dust. Then on December 23, 2000 Rikiji left Oblivion Dust, who later disband in September 2001. In early 2001 he reformed Mega8Ball, being the only original member. Oblivion Dust and Rikiji reunited in September 2007.

References

External links
 Official Facebook
 Mega8Ball official site
 Mega8Ball Official Myspace

Japanese alternative rock musicians
Musicians from Saitama Prefecture
Japanese male composers
Japanese composers
Japanese rock bass guitarists
1971 births
Living people
Male bass guitarists
21st-century bass guitarists
21st-century Japanese male musicians